Someplace Strange is a graphic novel, published in 1988 by Marvel Comics under that company's Epic Comics imprint. It was written by Ann Nocenti, with artwork by John Bolton.

References

Someplace Strange at the Big Comic Book DataBase

External links
John Bolton's official site

1988 graphic novels
1988 comics debuts
Epic Comics titles
Marvel Comics graphic novels
Science fiction comics
Books written by Ann Nocenti